Whatever It Takes is a gospel album by Mary Alessi.

Track listing
"With My Whole Heart" (Mary Alessi) - 03:33
"Praise the Lord" (Alessi) - 03:55
"Blessed Be The Lord" (Martha Munizzi) - 04:28
"All For Me" (Alessi) - 04:06
"Lord You've Been Good to Me" (Alessi) - 05:01
"Sing for Joy" (Alessi, Deryl Lampkin) - 04:50
"Lord I'm Yours" (Clint Brown) - 03:41
"You Make All The Difference" (Alessi) - 06:18
"Whatever It Takes" (Alessi, Lampkin) - 06:13
"Con Mi Corazón" (Alessi) - 03:26
"Gloria A Dios" (Alessi) - 03:57
"Bendito Es El Señor" (Munizzi) - 04:19

Personnel
Mary Alessi - Lead Vocals, Keyboards
Kinetra Only - Background Vocals
Essie  - Background Vocals
Armando Gomez  - Background Vocals
Tony Izquierdo -  - Background Vocals
Martha Munizzi - Lead Vocals on "Blessed Be the Lord"
Deryl Lampkin - Keyboards
Kiko Donadel - Guitar
Rodney Clayton - Bass
Alton Hudson - Drums
Orlando Contreras Jr. - Percussions

References

Mary Alessi albums
2003 live albums